Turanj is one of the suburbs of the city of Karlovac, Croatia, with a population of 2,615. It is located in the south of the city, separated from the rest by the rivers Mrežnica and Korana. The D1 highway passes through Turanj.

References

External links

Populated places in Karlovac County